Hednotodes metaxantha is a species of snout moth in the genus Hednotodes. It was described by George Hampson in 1918 and is known from western Australia.

References

Moths described in 1918
Chrysauginae